The International Paralympic Committee recognises the fastest performances in swimming events at the Paralympic Games. Swimming has been part of at every Summer Paralympic Games.

Races are held in four swimming strokes: freestyle, backstroke, breaststroke and butterfly over varying distances and in either individual or relay race events. Medley events combine all four strokes, again either as an individual format (swum in order: butterfly, backstroke, breaststroke, freestyle) and as a team relay (swim in order: backstroke, breaststroke, butterfly, freestyle). Competitors are allocated a classification based on their ability in the water, with records available for each event in each classification.
 1-10: Physical disability: Classes S1, SB1, SM1 for athletes who are least physically able; S10, SB9, SM10 for those with greatest ability in the water
 11-13: Visual impairment: Class S11 for totally blind athletes, to class S13 for athletes who have some vision, but are considered legally blind
 14: Intellectual disability
Not all events are offered at each Paralympic Games. The decision is made by the IPC based on factors including there being a minimum of 6 athletes from a minimum of 4 National Paralympic Committees to make a race viable. In addition, an event must have been also held at the previous Games, or at the IPC Swimming World Championships held between the Games. In total there is an aim to provide a minimum of 7 individual events and 2 relays events for all classes, with an overall total of 140 events being contested at each Games. The currently used classification system has been in use since the 2000 Sydney Games.

Men's records

50 m freestyle

100 m freestyle

200 m freestyle

400 m freestyle

50 m backstroke

100 m backstroke

200 m backstroke

50 m breaststroke

100 m breaststroke

200 m breaststroke

50 m butterfly

100 m butterfly

150 m individual medley

200 m individual medley

400 m individual medley

Freestyle relays

Medley relays

Women's records

50 m freestyle

100 m freestyle

200 m freestyle

400 m freestyle

50 m backstroke

100 m backstroke

200 m backstroke

50 m breaststroke

100 m breaststroke

200 m breaststroke

50 m butterfly

100 m butterfly

150 m individual medley

200 m individual medley

400 m individual medley

Freestyle relays

Medley relays

Mixed relays

See also
 List of IPC world records in swimming
 Swimming at the Summer Paralympics
 List of Olympic records in swimming

References

External links
 
 

Records
Paralympic
Records
Swimming records
Swimming